J49 may refer to:
 Augmented triangular prism
 , a minesweeper of the Royal Navy
 Packard J49, a turbojet engine